Rubén Ruzafa Cueto (born 9 September 1984 in Valencia) is a professional triathlete, cyclo-cross and mountain bike cyclist. He is a four-time World Triathlon Cross world champion and a three-time XTERRA Triathlon world champion.

Major results

Cyclo-cross
2006
1st  U23 National Cyclo-cross Championships

Mountain

2004
1st  U23 National Cross-country Championships
2005
1st  World Team Relay Championships (with José Antonio Hermida, Oliver Avilés and Rocio Gaminal)
1st  U23 National Cross-country Championships
2006
1st  U23 National Cross-country Championships
2008
1st  National Cross-country Championships

Triathlon

2008
1st Xterra World Championships
2013
1st Xterra World Championships
2014
1st World Cross Triathlon Championships
1st Xterra World Championships
2015
1st World Cross Triathlon Championships
2016
1st World Cross Triathlon Championships
1st European Cross Triathlon Championships

External links
World Triathlon athlete profile

References

1984 births
Living people
Spanish male triathletes
Spanish male cyclists
Cyclists from the Valencian Community
Sportspeople from Valencia